Jonathan Pudas (born 26 April 1993) is a Swedish professional ice hockey player. He is currently playing with Skellefteå AIK of the Swedish Hockey League (SHL).

Early life
Pudas was born in Kiruna, Sweden, to Finnish-speaking parents from Pajala Municipality. Pudas himself does not speak Finnish.

Playing career
Pudas made his Swedish Hockey League debut playing with Brynäs IF during the 2015–16 SHL season.

After three seasons with Skellefteå AIK, posting a career best 13 goals and 36 points in 52 games during the 2019–20 season, Pudas left the SHL as a free agent and signed a two-year contract with Finnish club, Jokerit of the Kontinental Hockey League (KHL), on 12 May 2020.

Pudas appeared with Jokerit in the 2020–21 season, collecting 2 goals and 10 points through 41 regular season games. After an early post-season exit, he returned to previous club, Skellefteå AIK of the SHL, on a three-year contract on 18 March 2021.

Career statistics

Regular season and playoffs

International

References

External links

1993 births
Living people
Brynäs IF players
Jokerit players
Karlskrona HK players
Skellefteå AIK players
Swedish ice hockey defencemen
People from Kiruna Municipality
Swedish people of Finnish descent
Ice hockey players at the 2022 Winter Olympics
Olympic ice hockey players of Sweden
Sportspeople from Norrbotten County